Sterling Park may refer to several places in the United States:

 Sterling Park, a housing development in Sterling, Virginia
 Sterling State Park in Monroe, Michigan
 Sterling Forest State Park in Orange County, New York